Eleocharis halophila, the saltmarsh spikerush, is a perennial halophytic plant endemic to salt marshes in eastern Canada, in Ontario in Hudson Bay and James Bay, Quebec in the St. Lawrence Seaway as far as the city of Quebec, Newfoundland and Nova Scotia and in the United States from Maine to North Carolina. It is one of 76 species of Eleocharis amongst the 36 genera in the sedge family (Cyperaceae).

Eleocharis halophila is listed as an "obligate wetland" (OBL) species, and occurs almost always (estimated probability 99%) under natural conditions in wetlands.

The plant is listed by federal and state authorities as either threatened or endangered in multiple states, where it also known by various common names:
Maryland:salt-marsh spikerush: Endangered
New Hampshire: salt-loving spike-rush: Threatened
New York: salt-marsh spikerush: Threatened
North Carolina: salt spikerush: Threatened

References

halophila
Plants described in 1935